Pleurocalyptus is a group of shrubs and small trees in the family Myrtaceae, first described as a genus in 1868. The entire genus is endemic to New Caledonia. It is closely related to Xanthostemon.

Species
 Pleurocalyptus austrocaledonicus (Guillaumin) J.W.Dawson
 Pleurocalyptus pancheri (Brongn. & Gris) J.W.Dawson

References

Myrtaceae genera
Endemic flora of New Caledonia
Myrtaceae
Taxa named by Jean Antoine Arthur Gris
Taxa named by Adolphe-Théodore Brongniart